The Hillel Yaffe Medical Center is a major hospital on the western edge of Hadera, Israel. It serves a population of about 450,000 residents in an area ranging from Zikhron Ya'akov in the north to Netanya in the south, from the Mediterranean coast in the west to Umm el-Fahm and the Green Line in the east. The center is named after Hillel Yaffe, a pioneering Yishuv doctor who worked in nearby Jewish settlements during the First Aliyah in the early 20th century.

History
 1957 – The hospital was founded in a number of small wooden shacks that were erected on the sand dunes to the west of Hadera.
 1967 – The academic school named after Pat Matthews was founded.
 1970–1975 – The hospital was the national center for organ transplants, under the leadership of Dr. Erwin Ya'akov, the manager of the surgery division.
 1980 – The modern building for patients was populated. It continues to serve the majority of units at the hospital.

Buildings
The hospital complex includes the following buildings:
 The main building was designed by the architect Ilya Belzitzman and was dedicated in 1980. North of this building, facing the entrance to the emergency department, stands a statue of the professor and doctor Rafi Karso, who was the manager of the neurology division, the institute for alternative medicine, and the institute for pain management.
 Laboratories and institutes building was designed by the architect Alex Shohet.
 Inpatient B building opened in 2010
 Birthing Center

Diverse population and staff
A diverse group of doctors and nurses works at the Hillel Yaffe Medical Center: Arabs and Jews, natives and immigrants. The patients also reflect the diversity of the region's population: urban people alongside rural farmers, natives and immigrants, Jews and Arabs. The hospital thus serves as an example of peaceful coexistence between Arabs and Jews, and of absorbing immigrants from the Soviet Union, Ethiopia and other lands.

Divisions and units

Institutes
 Gastroenterology and hepatology
 Pediatric development and rehabilitation
 Nephrology and high blood pressure
 Radiology
 Cardiology
 Pathology
 Sexual health
 Hematology
 Dermatology
 Holistic (alternative) medicine
 Mental health

References

 This article was translated from the Hebrew Wikipedia on 10 March 2008.

External links
 Hillel Yaffe Medical Center homepage (Hebrew)
 Hillel Yaffe Medical Center homepage (English)

Hospital buildings completed in 1980
Hospitals in Israel
Hospitals established in 1957
Hadera
Buildings and structures in Haifa District
1957 establishments in Israel